Dry Fork is an unincorporated community in Pittsylvania County, in the U.S. state of Virginia.

References

Unincorporated communities in Pittsylvania County, Virginia
Unincorporated communities in Virginia